Jari Pyykölä (born 29 February 1956) is a Finnish football manager. He is currently the Coaching Director of Finnish third-tier club Tervarit.

Pyykölä has managed FC Jazz, FC Lahti, KuPS and VPS in the Finnish premier division Veikkausliiga. He was the head coach of Swedish club IF Brommapojkarna from 1998 to 1999. In 1998 the club was promoted to Superettan.

Pyykölä won the 1996 Finnish Championship title with FC Jazz. Ten months later he was replaced by Jukka Vakkila, just couple of days before the first leg of 1997–98 UEFA Champions League second qualifying round against Feyenoord. In 2008 Pyykölä was named as the head coach of OPS Oulu but he resigned before the season started.

Honors 
Finnish Championship: 1996

References 

1956 births
Finnish football managers
Expatriate football managers in Sweden
FC Jazz managers
IF Brommapojkarna managers
Kuopion Palloseura managers
FC Lahti managers
Vaasan Palloseura managers
Living people